Tmesiphantes crassifemur is a species of theraphosine theraphosid spider. It is native to Argentina.

Taxonomic history
In 1960, Berta Gerschman de Pikelin and Rita Schiapelli described this species as Melloleitaoina crassifemur. In 1993, Gunter Schmidt transferred the species to Dryptopelma, but this was rejected by Fernando Pérez-Miles in 1996. In 2019, the species was transferred to Tmesiphantes.

Characteristics
Tmesiphantes crassifemur is only known from the male. It is characterized by a very curved embolus without any triangular tooth. The prolateral inferior embolar keel is just as long as the prolateral superior and the apex of the embolus is widened.

References

Theraphosidae
Spiders of Argentina
Spiders described in 1960